Brachyotum is a genus of flowering plants in the family Melastomataceae. There are about 58 species native to the Andes of South America.

Species include:
 Brachyotum alpinum Cogn.
 Brachyotum azuayense Wurdack
 Brachyotum benthamianum Triana
 Brachyotum campanulare (Bonpl.) Triana 
 Brachyotum campii Wurdack
 Brachyotum confertum (Bonpl.) Triana
 Brachyotum ecuadorense Wurdack
 Brachyotum fictum Wurdack
 Brachyotum fraternum Wurdack
 Brachyotum gleasonii Wurdack
 Brachyotum gracilescens Triana
 Brachyotum harlingii Wurdack
 Brachyotum incrassatum E.Cotton
 Brachyotum jamesonii Triana
 Brachyotum johannes-julii E.Cotton
 Brachyotum ledifolium Triana
 Brachyotum rotundifolium Cogn.
 Brachyotum rugosum Wurdack
 Brachyotum russatum E.Cotton
 Brachyotum sertulatum Ulloa
 Brachyotum strigosum  (L.f.) Triana 
 Brachyotum trichocalyx Triana

References

External links

 
Melastomataceae genera
Taxonomy articles created by Polbot